This is a list of flag bearers who have represented the Netherlands at the Olympics.

Flag bearers carry the national flag of their country at the opening ceremony of the Olympic Games.

See also
Netherlands at the Olympics

References

Netherlands at the Olympics
Netherlands
Olympic